The Battle of Maritsa or Battle of Chernomen (in tr. Second Battle of Maritsa) took place at the Maritsa River near the village of Chernomen (present-day Ormenio, Greece) on 26 September 1371 between Ottoman forces commanded by Lala Şahin Pasha and Evrenos, and Serbian forces commanded by King Vukašin Mrnjavčević and his brother Despot Jovan Uglješa.

Background

In 1354, the Ottomans acquired Gallipoli. From there, they expanded into Thrace, taking the important city of Adrianople in 1369. They reached the borders of Uglješa's lands. Uglješa  tried to create a coalition against them. He failed to secure support from the Byzantines and the Bulgarians. Most of the Serbian lords were occupied fighting each other and the only Serbian lord who supported Uglješa's ideas was his brother Vukašin.

In the summer of 1371, Vukašin marched to Zeta, to support his relative Đurađ Balšić in his war against Nikola Altomanović. His army was in Skadar, waiting for naval support from the Republic of Ragusa. Uglješa received information that the majority of Ottoman forces left Europe and marched to Anatolia. He decided it was a good time to execute his offensive plans and asked Vukašin for help. Vukašin left Skadar with his army and joined Uglješa. They marched against Adrianople.

Battle
The Serbian army numbered between 50,000 and 70,000 men. Despot Uglješa wanted to make a surprise attack on the Ottomans in their capital city, Edirne, while Murad I was in Asia Minor. The Ottoman army was much smaller, Byzantine Greek scholar Laonikos Chalkokondyles and different sources give the number of 800 up to 4,000 men, but due to superior tactics, by conducting a night raid on the Serbian camp, Şâhin Paşa was able to defeat the Serbian army and kill King Vukašin and despot Uglješa. Thousands of Serbs were killed, and thousands drowned in the Maritsa river when they tried to flee. After the battle, it was said, the Maritsa ran scarlet with blood.

Aftermath
South Serbia fell under Ottoman power after this battle. The battle was a part of the Ottoman campaign to conquer the Balkans and was preceded by the Ottoman capturing of Sozopol in modern Bulgaria and succeeded by the capture of the cities of Drama, Kavála, and Serrai in modern Greece. The battle preceded the later 1389 Battle of Kosovo, and was one of many in the Serbian–Turkish wars.

See also

 List of military disasters

Notes

References

 Rossos, Andrew, Macedonia and the Macedonians, Hoover Institution Press Publications, 2008.
 Sedlar, Jean W., East Central Europe in the Middle Ages, 1000–1500, University of Washington Press, 1994.
 Stavrianos, L. S. The Balkans Since 1453, C. Hurst & Co. Publishers, 2000.
 Turnbull, Stephen R. The Ottoman Empire 1326–1699, Osprey Publishing, 2003.

Further reading

External links

 Battle of the Maritsa River Encyclopædia Britannica

1371 in Europe
Conflicts in 1371
Battles of the Ottoman–Serbian Wars
Mrnjavčević family
Serbian Empire
14th century in Bulgaria
14th century in Serbia
Ottoman Serbia
History of Edirne Province
1371 in the Ottoman Empire